Ransom Canyon is a town in Lubbock County of West Texas, United States. The population was 1,096 at the 2010 census. It is part of the Lubbock Metropolitan Statistical Area.

Geography
The town of Ransom Canyon is located within Yellow House Canyon, at the eastern edge of the Llano Estacado.  Yellow House Canyon was carved by the North Fork Double Mountain Fork Brazos River. This stream has been dammed multiple times to form Buffalo Springs Lake and Lake Ransom Canyon.

Climate
According to the Köppen Climate Classification system, Ransom Canyon has a semi-arid climate, abbreviated "BSk" on climate maps.

Demographics

2020 census

As of the 2020 United States census, there were 1,189 people, 400 households, and 309 families residing in the town.

2000 census
As of the census of 2000, there were 1,011 people, 404 households, and 338 families residing in the town. The population density was 1,213.1 people per square mile (470.3/km2). There were 412 housing units at an average density of 494.4/sq mi (191.7/km2). The racial makeup of the town was 95.25% White, 0.40% African American, 0.20% Native American, 0.40% Asian, 2.57% from other races, and 1.19% from two or more races. Hispanic or Latino of any race were 4.85% of the population.

There were 404 households, out of which 31.2% had children under the age of 18 living with them, 80.0% were married couples living together, 3.2% had a female householder with no husband present, and 16.1% were non-families. 14.6% of all households were made up of individuals, and 6.9% had someone living alone who was 65 years of age or older. The average household size was 2.50 and the average family size was 2.76.

In the town, the population was spread out, with 22.0% under the age of 18, 4.5% from 18 to 24, 23.5% from 25 to 44, 36.5% from 45 to 64, and 13.5% who were 65 years of age or older. The median age was 45 years. For every 100 females, there were 94.4 males. For every 100 females age 18 and over, there were 90.6 males.

The median income for a household in the town was $78,427, and the median income for a family was $85,944. Males had a median income of $50,000 versus $34,500 for females. The per capita income for the town was $45,675. None of the families and 0.6% of the population were living below the poverty line, including no under eighteens and 0.7% of those over 64.

Education
Ransom Canyon is served by the Roosevelt and Slaton 
Independent School Districts.

Robert Bruno

Robert R. Bruno Jr. (1945–2008) was a sculptor and inventor who was born in Los Angeles in 1945, Robert grew up in Mexico and the United States before attending Dominican College in Racine, Wisconsin and graduate school at the University of Notre Dame.  He moved to Lubbock in 1971 to teach art at Texas Tech University's school of architecture.  He started working on The Steel House in 1973, two years after sculpting a similar piece of art, (now a permanent installation in front of the TTU School of Architecture) which inspired him to build something bigger to live in.  Made of weathering steel and weighing 110 tons on four hollow legs, the 2,200 square foot house on three levels was completed 10 months before his death in 2008.  In 1982, he and wife, Patricia Mills, founded P&R Surge Systems.  
Robert, General contractor, Rick Denser, Master Stone Mason, Manfred Kaiter and Venture Capitalist, Mark Lawson started work on Lawson's 460 ton Rock House in 1991, which was inspired by the work of Antoni Gaudi.

Popular culture
On June 25 and 26 of 2013, Ransom Canyon was the site of a Vogue (magazine) fall-fashion photo shoot. Three models, Raquel Zimmermann, Toni Garrn and brother Niklas Garrn, were photographed by Steven Klein in and around Robert Bruno's steel house, sometimes wearing Google Glass.  Photographs appear in the September 2013 issue of Vogue.

The Steel House was featured on an episode of Texas Country Reporter with Bob Phillips shortly before Bruno's death.

See also

Yellow House Canyon
Robert R. Bruno Jr.
Buffalo Springs, Texas
Farm to Market Road 400
Caprock Escarpment
Canyon Valley, Texas
Duffy's Peak
Double Mountain Fork Brazos River
North Fork Double Mountain Fork Brazos River
Salt Fork Brazos River

References

External links

Robert Bruno Steel House
Vogue magazine September 2013 issue featuring Bruno's steel house
Twill Magazine, page 49
Public domain images of the Llano Estacado and West Texas
P&R Surge Systems, the company Robert Bruno founded

Towns in Lubbock County, Texas
Llano Estacado
Lubbock metropolitan area
Towns in Texas
1965 establishments in Texas